Events in the year 1903 in Panama.

Events

November 
 November 18: The Hay–Bunau-Varilla Treaty, creating the Panama Canal Zone.

 
Years of the 20th century in Panama
Panama
Panama